The 1953–54 season was the 74th season of competitive football by Rangers.

Overview
Rangers played a total of 46 competitive matches during the 1953–54 season.

Results
All results are written with Rangers' score first.

Scottish League Division A

Scottish Cup

League Cup

Appearances

See also
 1953–54 in Scottish football
 1953–54 Scottish Cup
 1953–54 Scottish League Cup

References 

Rangers F.C. seasons
Rangers